Choerophryne microps is a species of frogs in the family Microhylidae. It is endemic to Western New Guinea and known from the Wondiwoi Mountains, at the base of the Wandammen Peninsula. Common name small-eyed choerophryne has been suggested for it.

Description
Adult males measure  and females  in snout–urostyle length. The snout is very long (21–25% of the body length) and pointed. The eyes are relatively small (hence the specific name microps, or "small-eyed", derived from Greek). The tympanum is small and partly covered by the supra-tympanic fold. The fingers and toes bear discs. Both dorsal and ventral surfaces have light to dark grey ground color, with dark brown markings. There is an hour-glass marking on the dorsum.

The male advertisement call is a series of distinctly pulsed notes, typically with 5–9 notes. Each note consists of 9 to 29 pulses, with dominant frequency at 4 kHz.

Habitat and ecology
It was found to be locally very common, with highest abundance at intermediate altitudes (500–700 m). Males call from on or in leaf litter or rotting logs, sometimes higher from the ground (to 1 m) in the hollows of plant stems. The diet is dominated by small ants.

References

microps
Endemic fauna of Indonesia
Amphibians of Western New Guinea
Frogs of Asia
Amphibians described in 2008